Harmon Valley is an unincorporated community in northern Alberta, Canada.

The community was named for Daniel Harmon, a fur trader.

The Harmon Valley Fair Grounds is hosts to the Harmon Valley Quad Rally.

Administration 
The community is located in census division No. 17. It is administered by Northern Sunrise County, and is represented by the Ward 1 - Harmon Valley / Reno councillor.

Geography 

The Harmon Member of the Peace River Formation, a stratigraphic unit of the Western Canadian Sedimentary Basin is named for the community.

See also 
List of communities in Alberta

References 

Localities in Northern Sunrise County